China International may refer to:

 China Open (snooker), a professional snooker tournament, formerly known as "China International"
 China Power International Development, a government owned company in the People's Republic of China.
 China Taiping Insurance Holdings, insurance conglomerate incorporated and headquartered in Hong Kong, formerly known as "China Insurance International"
 China Review International, a journal for English-language reviews of recently published China-related books and monographs
 China Radio International, a state-owned media in China.